Maciej Grzegorz Lasek (born. 15 June 1967 in Elbląg) – is a Polish engineer, specializing in flight mechanics, PhD, Chairman of the Committee for Investigation of National Aviation Accidents. He was the head of a commission that investigated the 2010 Polish Air Force Tu-154 crash.

References

1967 births
Living people
Polish engineers
Polish civil servants
Members of the Polish Sejm 2019–2023